Aleksander Michał Lubomirski is the name of:

Aleksander Michał Lubomirski (d. 1675), starosta of Perejesław and Nowy Sącz
Aleksander Michał Lubomirski (d. 1677), voivode of Kraków